Odd Hassel (17 May 1897 – 11 May 1981) was a Norwegian physical chemist and Nobel Laureate.

Biography
Hassel was born in Kristiania (now Oslo), Norway. His parents were Ernst Hassel (1848–1905), a gynaecologist, and Mathilde Klaveness (1860–1955). In 1915, he entered the University of Oslo where he studied mathematics, physics and chemistry, and graduated in 1920. Victor Goldschmidt was Hassel's tutor when he began studies in Oslo, while Heinrich Jacob Goldschmidt, Victor's father, was Hassel's thesis advisor. Father and son were important figures in Hassel's life and they remained friends. After taking a year off from studying, he went to Munich, Germany to work in the laboratory of Professor Kasimir Fajans.

His work there led to the detection of absorption indicators. After moving to Berlin, he worked at the Kaiser Wilhelm Institute, where he began to do research on X-ray crystallography. He furthered his research with a Rockefeller Fellowship, obtained with the help of Fritz Haber. In 1924, he obtained his PhD from Humboldt University of Berlin, before moving to his alma mater, the University of Oslo, where he worked from 1925 through 1964. He became a professor in 1934.

His work was interrupted in October, 1943 when he and other university staff members were arrested by the Nasjonal Samling and handed over to the occupation authorities. He spent time in several detention camps, until he was released in November, 1944.

Work

Hassel originally focused on inorganic chemistry, but beginning in 1930 his work concentrated on problems connected with molecular structure, particularly the structure of cyclohexane and its derivatives. He introduced the Norwegian scientific community to the concepts of the electric dipole moments and electron diffraction. The work for which he is best known established the three-dimensionality of molecular geometry. He focused his research on ring-shaped carbon molecules, which he suspected filled three dimensions instead of two, the common belief of the time. By using the number of bonds between the carbon and hydrogen atoms, Hassel demonstrated the impossibility of the molecules existing on only one plane. This discovery led to him being awarded the Nobel Prize in Chemistry for 1969.

Honors
Hassel was awarded the Nobel Prize in Chemistry in 1969, shared with English chemist Derek Barton.

He received the Guldberg-Waage Medal (Guldberg-Waage Medal) from the Norwegian Chemical Society and the Gunnerus Medal from the Royal Norwegian Society of Science and Letters, both in 1964.

Hassel held honorary degrees from the University of Copenhagen (1950) and University of Stockholm (1960). An annual lecture named in his honor is given at the University of Oslo.

He was an honorary Fellow of the Norwegian Chemical Society,  Chemical Society of London, Norwegian Academy of Science and Letters, Royal Danish Academy of Sciences and Letters and Royal Swedish Academy of Sciences.

He was made a Knight of the Order of St. Olav in 1960.

See also
Cyclohexane conformation
Halogen bond

References

Related reading

Laylin, James K.  (1993) Nobel Laureates in Chemistry, 1901-1992 (Chemical Heritage Foundation)

External links
  including his Nobel Lecture June 9, 1970 Structural Aspects of Interatomic Charge-Transfer Bonding

1897 births
1981 deaths
Scientists from Oslo
University of Oslo alumni
Humboldt University of Berlin alumni
Academic staff of the University of Oslo
Norwegian physical chemists
Rockefeller Fellows
Members of the Norwegian Academy of Science and Letters
Fellows of the Royal Society of Chemistry
Members of the Royal Danish Academy of Sciences and Letters
Members of the Royal Swedish Academy of Sciences
Recipients of the St. Olav's Medal
Norwegian Nobel laureates
Nobel laureates in Chemistry